Wust El-Balad is an Egyptian Soft rock band, founded in Cairo in 1999. The band released four albums, the self-titled Wust El-Balad in 2007, Rubabekya in 2011, "Karakib" in 2014, and "Bantalony El Jeans" in 2018.

Members

Co-founders
Ahmed Omran – oud and flute
Hany Adel – guitar and vocals

Other members
Adham El-Said – (Vocals).
Mohammed Gamal El-Din – nicknamed Mizo – percussion and drums
Ahmed Omer – Bass
Asaad Nessim – acoustic guitar
Ehab Abdel-Hameed – nicknamed Bob – percussions

Discography

Wust El-Balad (2007)

Wust El-Balad, is the self-titled debut album of the band released in 2007.

Track listing
"Arabily" – 4:18 (Get closer to me)
"Wust El Balad" – 4:24 (A song which tells the story of the band, wust el balad means downtown)
"Shams El Nahar" – 4:34 (The sun of the day, a motivational song which gives hope)
"Antika" – 4:05 (Antique, A song addressing those who let their lovers have full control of their lives till their hearts become and "Antika" in their places)
"Yemken" – 5:34 (Maybe)
"Hela Hop" – 4:21 (An expression used in Arabic to motivate people doing a hard job to continue)
"A'm Mina" – 5:19 (A name of a character they made up to show some part of the traditional life in Egypt)
"Magnoun" – 3:27 (Crazy)
"Etkalemy" – 3:06 (Speak up)
"Kol Lel Maliha" – 3:52 (Tell the beautiful one, the lyrics were of a very old Arabic poem sung with modern music)

Rubabekya (2011)

Rubabekya is second album by the band released in 2011.

Track listing
"Robabekya" – 4:35
"Kol Youm" – 6:05
"Ala Hesb Wedadak" – 4:06
"Soal Wahed" – 4:43
"Men Gowa Al Qahera" – 3:05
"Aly" – 4:04
"Ya Jzera" – 5:26
"Aneqeni" – 4:14
"El Garia Wel Sultan" – 5:11
"Le Habibon" – 5:28

Karakib (2014)

Karakib is third album by the band released in 2014.

Track listing
"Karakib" (junk) – 5:05
"HEB Nafsak" (love your self) – 3:07
"El denya ballona" (the world is a balloon) – 4:51
"El oghnya el frensya" (the French song) – 3:21
"Mandel ya beh" – 4:24
"zay El sukkar" (like sugar) – 4:43
"Ya abo el benettah" – 3:35

References

External links
Official site

Egyptian musical groups
Egyptian rock music groups